Mackenzie Firgens is an American actress.

Biography
Firgens studied theatre at the Goodman School of Drama at DePaul University. She has performed with the Tony Award winning San Francisco Mime Troupe.

Firgens made her feature film debut starring as Harmony in the underground hit Groove. Firgens played the role of April in the film version of the Broadway sensation Rent.

Firgens also starred in Quality of Life and appeared on the films Broken Arrows, Break, My Name Is Khan, and The Thompsons.

Filmography

Film

Television

Awards
Firgens was nominated for the Best Actress award at the Down Beach Film Festival for her role as Helen in the film Gerald.

References

External links

21st-century American actresses
American film actresses
American television actresses
DePaul University alumni
Living people
Year of birth missing (living people)